Lee Byrne (born 1 June 1980) is a Welsh former professional rugby union and rugby league footballer who played in the 2000s and 2010s.

Club career
Byrne started his career playing rugby union for Bridgend Athletic RFC; and Tondu RFC, as a full-back or wing, and after being spotted playing rugby league for Bridgend Blue Bulls, he signed for the Llanelli Scarlets.

While playing against Connacht in 2007, Byrne demonstrated his abilities as a stand-in kicker when he kicked two penalties and two conversions after fly-half Shaun Connor went off injured.

Given permission to seek a new club for the 2011–12 season, Byrne signed a three-year deal to play for French club ASM Clermont Auvergne, where he will play his club rugby post the 2011 Rugby World Cup.

On 8 January 2014, it was reported that Byrne had agreed to join Newport Gwent Dragons from the end of the 2013–14 season.

On 23 April 2015, it was announced Byrne was to retire from all rugby with immediate effect, after failing to recover from a shoulder injury.

International career
Following his good performances for the Llanelli Scarlets in both the Celtic League, and the Heineken Cup during the 2005–06 season, he was called up to the national squad for the November Test series. He made his début as a replacement against the All Blacks on 5 November at the Millennium Stadium. Wales lost 3–41. He also played in the win over Fiji, and the defeat by South Africa. He has since played during the 2006 Six Nations Championship, and earned a further two caps in a mid-year series against Argentina. His sole appearance in the 2006 Autumn internationals was on the wing against the Pacific Islands. Byrne was a revelation in the 2008 Six Nations Championship tournament at full back and a key component of Wales' Grand Slam.

He scored tries against England and Italy in the 2008 Six Nations Championship. Following his superb performances for Wales in the 2008 Autumn Internationals against South Africa, New Zealand, and Australia (which included a try against the latter), Byrne had been tipped not only for a place in the British & Irish Lions squad, but also a place in the starting 15. This was confirmed on 21 April 2009, when Byrne, along with Ireland's Rob Kearney, were selected as one of the British & Irish Lions' fullbacks for the tour. After the fourth tour match he was one of five players to be picked for three of them.

He caused controver in February 2010 during the Scotland match when Scotland's coach Andy Robinson accused Byrne of diving to get substitute fly-half Phil Godman sent off and give Wales a penalty, from which they scored and went on to win the match.

Byrne was a member of the Wales squad for the 2011 Rugby World Cup. He earned his final cap in the pool match against Fiji.

International tries

Wales

British & Irish Lions

Personal
It was announced in March 2011 that Byrne had become engaged to ITV Wales Tonight presenter Andrea Benfield; they married on New Year's Day 2012.

Byrne has spoken publicly about his dyslexia. It has caused him some setbacks - "There were a couple of times where I would go out and the French players would say I wasn’t picking up French very easily. I remember one of the players saying I was lazy and I wasn’t learning. Obviously there was a reason because of my dyslexia, so that upset me a little bit" - but it has not been exclusively a negative for him - "I could see space before it happened - quicker than anybody else - so in a way I suppose it was a gift for me."

In November 2017, Lee Byrne published his autobiography, The Byrne Identity. Sections from it were serialised over four issues of The Western Mail (Wales).

References

External links
(archived by web.archive.org) Ospreys profile
(archived by web.archive.org) Wales profile
 Lee Byrne on sporting-heroes.net
(archived by web.archive.org) Lee Byrne at ercrugby.com

1980 births
Living people
ASM Clermont Auvergne players
Bridgend Blue Bulls players
British & Irish Lions rugby union players from Wales
Dragons RFC players
Ospreys (rugby union) players
Rugby league players from Bridgend
Rugby union fullbacks
Rugby union players from Bridgend
Scarlets players
Tondu RFC players
Wales international rugby union players
Welsh Roman Catholics
Welsh rugby league players
Welsh rugby union players